"So Special" is a song recorded by Japanese-American singer-songwriter Ai and Japanese singer-songwriter Atsushi of Exile. It was released on September 10, 2008 alongside "Okuribito" as a double A-side single, by Island Records and Universal Sigma. The song and "Okuribito" served as the lead singles for Ai's seventh studio album, Viva Ai.

Background 
"So Special" was written by Ai and Atsushi as a duet. Two versions of the song were recorded, a "Version Ai" and a "Version EX". In July 2008, Avex Group announced the "Version EX" of the song was to be included on Exile's greatest hits album, . The band's greatest hits album was initially announced in June 2008. In August, Universal Japan announced Ai's version of the song was to be included on the physical release of "Okuribito", a song she recorded for Departures, as a double A-side single.

Promotion and live performances 
"So Special" was used as the Music Fighter power play song. Ai performed "So Special" with Atsushi on Music Station on September 12.

Charts

Certifications

References 
2008 singles
2008 songs
Ai (singer) songs
Male–female vocal duets
Songs written by Ai (singer)
Island Records singles

Universal Sigma singles